A by-election was held for the New South Wales Legislative Assembly electorate of Oxley on 6 May 1965 following the death of Les Jordan.

Dates

Results

Les Jordan died.

See also
Electoral results for the district of Oxley
List of New South Wales state by-elections

References

1965 elections in Australia
New South Wales state by-elections
Oxley
May 1965 events in Australia